Wayne General Simmons (December 15, 1969 – August 23, 2002) was an American football linebacker in the National Football League.

Simmons was drafted by the Green Bay Packers with the 15th pick of the first round of the 1993 NFL Draft. Simmons played for Green Bay for four and a half years, earning a Super Bowl ring at the end of the 1996 season.  Simmons was well known for shutting down opposing tight ends, but in doing this task extremely well he was not able to obtain the attention-grabbing statistics of quarterback sacks. Simmons was traded to the Kansas City Chiefs during the 1997 season when Seth Joyner returned from knee surgery. The Chiefs waived Simmons in 1998 after a 30–7 Monday Night loss to their arch-rival Denver Broncos, in which Simmons and fellow linebacker Derrick Thomas were called for a total of five personal fouls on the Broncos' final touchdown drive.  The Buffalo Bills claimed Simmons off waivers on November 19, 1998, and played five games.  He was released by the team in February 1999.

Death
In the early morning hours of August 23, 2002, Simmons was killed at the age of 32 in a single-car crash on Interstate 70 in Independence, Missouri. Witnesses reported he was driving his Mercedes at high speed and weaving through traffic before losing control of the vehicle.  The car rolled several times before landing in a ditch and catching fire.

External links
Simmon's obituary at ESPN Classic
NFL.com player page

1969 births
2002 deaths
People from Hilton Head, South Carolina
Players of American football from South Carolina
American football linebackers
Clemson Tigers football players
Green Bay Packers players
Kansas City Chiefs players
Buffalo Bills players
Road incident deaths in Missouri